Hothfield  is a village and civil parish in the Ashford Borough of Kent, England and is  3 miles north-west of Ashford on the A20. It is completely split in two by Hothfield Common.

Geography
In the north west is Hothfield Common, 58 hectares (143 acres) of heathland and lowland valley bogs: a nature reserve managed by Kent Wildlife Trust,

To the immediate south is the private parkland of the former Hothfield House. This area is crossed by the Greensand Way passing the church en route to  Godinton House. A small part of the neighbourhood of Ram Lane is in the far northern point of the civil parish. Small tributaries of the West Stour rise in the parish.

Amenities
The village has a shop and post office with internal ATM service (closed Tuesday PM  and Sunday PM).  Hothfield Common has a children's playground and a multi-use all-weather games pitch adjacent to the south east and a car park to  the north just off the A20.
A large village community centre (hothfield village hall) is located on the edge of the village views over rolling fields
The former school is now a children's centre, run by sure start. It is called the bluebells children centre and runs many parent and child groups and midwife and health visitors drop in services

History
The medieval parish church is dedicated to Saint Margaret; it was rebuilt in 1598 after a fire.

Hothfield in Edward Hasted's Topography of Kent (1798) has a substantial amount of information about the history and the then layout of land and settlement.

Transport
The village is, for approximately one mile, immediately to the south-east of the A20 road, and is south of the M20 which has a very small border to the far north.
It is served by the 10X bus service operated by Stagecoach South East, stopping on the junction of Cades Road and Station Road, as well as the 123 bus service stopping on School Road.

It was served by Hothfield railway station on the Maidstone Line from 1884 until 1959. The nearest railway stations are Ashford International station and Charing station.

References

External links
Statistical civil parish overview - map

External links

Official website of Hothfield Parish Council

Villages in Kent
Villages in the Borough of Ashford
Civil parishes in Ashford, Kent